Davis Hanson Waite (April 9, 1825 – November 27, 1901) was an American politician. He was a member of the Populist Party, and he served as the eighth Governor of Colorado from 1893 to 1895.

Biography

Early years
Davis Hanson Waite was born April 9, 1825 in Jamestown, New York to Joseph Waite and Olive Davis Waite. He studied law and graduated from Jamestown Academy. In 1851, he married Frances Eliza Russell and together they had two children, Austin and Josephine. Waite served in the state legislatures of Wisconsin in 1857, and Kansas in 1879.

Waite and his family moved to Leadville, Colorado, in 1879 to practice law. After his wife Frances died in November 1880, he moved to Aspen. In Aspen he started the local newspaper and served as secretary of the local assembly of the Knights of Labor. He remarried to Celia O. Maltby (née Crane) on January 8, 1885. They had one son, Frank Hanson Waite.

Political career
Waite was elected to the Wisconsin Legislature as a Republican and had run a Republican newspaper in New York. In Colorado he edited the Union Era, a reform paper, and helped to organized the People's Party (Populists) national convention. In 1892 he was nominated as the Populist candidate for Governor of Colorado and he was inaugurated on January 10, 1893. A passionate supporter of the Populist's Omaha Platform, he was nicknamed "Bloody Bridles" for an 1893 speech, in which he proclaimed, "It is better, infinitely better that blood should flow to the horses' bridles rather than our national liberties should be destroyed."

His election coincided with the Panic of 1893 which hit the silver mining industry in Colorado particularly hard. In 1894, the Western Federation of Miners went on a five-month strike and Waite intervened on behalf of the union, ordering the deployment of the state militia to support and protect the miners. That same year Waite supported the American Railroad Union during the national Pullman Strike. As governor he was also instrumental in the passage of women's suffrage in Colorado, the second state to do so.

1894 Denver "City Hall War"
In 1893, a new municipal charter was given to Denver by the state legislature that decentralized much of the mayor's powers into six different administrative departments, two of which were elected, two appointed by the mayor, and the remaining two appointed by the governor. The municipal board members appointed by the governor had complete financial control over the police, fire, and excise departments.

Governor Waite tried to overturn the corruption in Denver in 1894 by removing police and fire commissioners that he thought were shielding gamblers and prostitutes. The officials refused to leave their positions and were quickly joined by others who felt their jobs were threatened. They barricaded themselves in City Hall, and the state militia were sent to remove them. Federal troops were called in from nearby Fort Logan to intervene and quell the civil strife. Eventually Governor Waite agreed to withdraw the militia and allow the state Supreme Court to decide the case. The court ruled that the governor had authority to replace the commissioners, but he was reprimanded for bringing in the militia, in what became known as the "City Hall War".

He was defeated for reelection in 1894, but continued to be active in the Populist movement until his death in 1901.

Death and legacy
Waite died on November 27, 1901 while preparing Thanksgiving dinner at his home in Aspen. His house on West Francis Street in Aspen has been listed on the National Register of Historic Places.

Footnotes

Further reading
 David B. Griffiths, "Far-Western Populist Thought: A Comparative Study of John R. Rogers and Davis H. Waite," Pacific Northwest Quarterly, vol. 60, no. 4 (Oct. 1969), pp. 183–192. In JSTOR.

External links

 

1825 births
1901 deaths
Governors of Colorado
Members of the Wisconsin State Assembly
Members of the Kansas House of Representatives
Politicians from Jamestown, New York
People from Aspen, Colorado
Colorado Democrats
Colorado Populists
People's Party state governors of the United States
American newspaper executives
Wisconsin Republicans
Colorado Republicans
New York (state) Republicans
Kansas Republicans
Journalists from New York (state)
Knights of Labor people
19th-century American politicians
19th-century American businesspeople